Paige Ackerson-Kiely was born in October 1975 in Biddeford, Maine.  She is a modern poet and also works for the Poetry Journal Handsome. She currently lives in Peekskill, New York.

Education 
Paige Ackerson-Kiely received a BA in Asian Studies from the University of New Mexico in Albuquerque.  Prior to this achievement, she attended Beloit College in Beloit, Wisconsin, Marmara University in Istanbul, and Birzeit University in Birzeit, Palestine.

Author 
Ackerson-Kiely is the author of In No One's Land (Ahsahta Press, 2007), a book of poetry that was selected for the 2006 Sawtooth Poetry Prize by poet D. A. Powell.  This book also won the award for Poets & Writers Exchange. Her second full length collection of poetry, My Love is a Dead Arctic Explorer (Ahsahta Press, 2012)  began as a response to Admiral Richard E. Byrd's memoir, Alone. In February, 2019, Penguin/Random House published her third volume of poetry, Dolefully, A Rampart Stands. About this collection, Publishers Weekly wrote that the "language here is stark and devastating."

Additionally, Ackerson-Kiely has produced a limited edition art folio, This Landscape (Argos Books 2010), and prose chapbook Book About a Candle Burning in a Shed (above/ground 2011). She has been published in numerous journals such as Pleiades, Bellingham Review, Ninth Letter, jubilat, LIT, and The Laurel Review. In 2009 she was one of the featured authors in the all-poetry edition of The Laurel Review, an edition that was dedicated to the memory of poet Reginald Shepherd.  She is currently a co-editor for Black Ocean's poetry journal Handsome, associate director of the Program in Writing at Sarah Lawrence College, and faculty member at the New England College MFA program.

Notes and references 

American women poets
1975 births
Living people
Birzeit University alumni
University of New Mexico alumni
Beloit College alumni
Marmara University alumni
21st-century American poets
21st-century American women writers